New York State Route 962J (NY 962J) is a  southwest-northeast reference route that, unlike most reference routes, has been signed as a touring route in Southern Tier town of Owego in Tioga County, New York. Its southwestern terminus is at NY 434 in the census-designated place of Apalachin and its northeastern terminus is at NY 17C south of the hamlet of Campville.

Route description

Shortly after NY 962J begins at NY 434, it passes over NY 17 (Future I-86) (the Southern Tier Expressway) and intersects the new ramps that lead to and from NY 17 westbound. This portion was previously part of the trumpet-style interchange that NY 17 westbound had with NY 434 at exit 66. NY 962J continues to the northeast crossing over the Susquehanna River.

On the other bank of the river, the highway passes over the Norfolk Southern-owned Southern Tier Line before reaching its northeastern terminus at NY 17C.

History
The bridge over the Susquehanna and the reconfiguration of the westbound ramps at exit 66 were completed in 2001, offering a convenient connector route across the Susquehanna. It was designated as a reference route at that time and marked as a touring route in early 2005. NY 962J is one of four reference routes in New York State signed as a touring route.

Major intersections

See also

NY 961F, NY 990L, and NY 990V – Other reference routes signed as touring routes

References

External links

62J
Transportation in Tioga County, New York